This is a list of years in Ecuador.

21st century

20th century

19th century

See also
 Timeline of Quito
List of years by country

 
History of Ecuador
Ecuador history-related lists
Ecuador